Ronald Alsop (25 April 1916 – 28 August 1970) was an  Australian rules footballer who played with Hawthorn in the Victorian Football League (VFL).

Notes

External links 

1916 births
1970 deaths
Australian rules footballers from Melbourne
Hawthorn Football Club players
Port Melbourne Football Club players
People from Malvern, Victoria